Seo Chang-bin, better known mononymously as Changbin, is a South Korean singer, rapper, songwriter, and composer from the South Korean boy group Stray Kids under JYP Entertainment. He is also a member of an in-house production team, and a sub-unit of Stray Kids, 3RACHA. All song credits are adapted from the Korea Music Copyright Association's (KOMCA) database, unless otherwise noted. As of December 2022, the KOMCA has 125 songs listed under his name as Changbin (3RACHA) and SpearB for his mixtape.


2017

2018

2019

2020

2021

2022

2023

See also
 List of songs recorded by Stray Kids

Notes

References 

Changbin
Changbin